The Pond Street School, also known as the Alice E. Fulton School, is an historic former school building at 235 Pond Street in Weymouth, Massachusetts.  The Colonial Revival brick building was constructed in 1928 to a design by architect Howard B. S. Prescott.  Originally built in an H shape, the building was extended in 1953 and 1958 to the northeast, and in 1967 with the addition of a gymnasium section to the west.  The latter portion was demolished and replaced by a new wing in 2008 during the conversion of the building to a senior living facility.  The building served as an elementary school until 1991; it was renamed Alice E. Fulton School, after its first principal, in 1964.

The building was listed on the National Register of Historic Places in 2010.

See also
National Register of Historic Places listings in Norfolk County, Massachusetts

References

National Register of Historic Places in Norfolk County, Massachusetts
Colonial Revival architecture in Massachusetts
Weymouth, Massachusetts